Silverlake Conservatory of Music is a nonprofit educational organization formed in California. It was founded in 2001 by Red Hot Chili Peppers bassist Flea and Chili Peppers collaborator Tree to foster music education. Chili Peppers vocalist Anthony Kiedis is also on the board. 

The facility organizes an annual "Hullabaloo", one of which featured performances by Red Hot Chili Peppers, Eddie Vedder and Charlie Haden raised $1 million for the Conservatory during an August 24, 2011 performance at Club Nokia.

Flea released his debut solo EP, Helen Burns, on July 19, 2012, through Silverlake's website. The EP features an appearance by co-founder Keith Barry, Patti Smith, former Chili Peppers drummer Jack Irons, current Chili Peppers drummer Chad Smith and the Silverlake kids' and adults' choir directed by S.J. Hasman.

On November 2, 2019, the Chili Peppers performed a charity event for the Conservatory with Eddie Vedder. This performance was the band's final show with guitarist Josh Klinghoffer. 

In June 2021, the choir featured on a compilation tribute album for Andy Gill, lead singer of post-punk band Gang of Four who died in February 2020 performing "Not Great Men", from their first album Entertainment!. Other musicians featured on the album include IDLES, Gary Numan, La Roux, The Dandy Warhols and Killing Joke.

References

External links
Web site 
YouTube page
crowdrise

Music organizations based in the United States